Zu ol Farrokh (also Romanized as Z̄ū ol Farrokh) is a village in Kuh Hamayi Rural District, Rud Ab District, Sabzevar County, Razavi Khorasan Province, Iran. At the 2006 census, its population was 128, in 30 families.

References 

Populated places in Sabzevar County